Cancer plebejus is a species of crab in the genus Cancer. Its common name is the Chilean crab.

Distribution 
C. plebejus can be found off the coast of Chile and Peru.

References 

Cancroidea